Alucita iberica is a moth of the family Alucitidae. It is found in Spain, mainland Italy and on Sicily.

References

Moths described in 1994
Alucitidae
Moths of Europe